Ruby K. Payne is an American educator and author best known for her book A Framework for Understanding Poverty and her work on the culture of poverty and its relation to education. She holds a Ph.D. in educational leadership and policy studies from Loyola University in Illinois, and is the founder of aha! Process, Inc., a company that informs schools, companies and other organizations about poverty.

A Framework for Understanding Poverty 
Payne's book, which has sold over one million copies, deals heavily with the concept of "hidden rules," characteristics that a member of one of the three main social classes (upper, middle and lower) possesses that makes communicating and relating to members of the other classes difficult. Payne supports the standardized testing methods of 2001's No Child Left Behind Act.

Criticism 
Many education professionals, such as Paul Gorski, assistant professor at New Century College at George Mason University, are openly critical of Payne's work, stating that her premises are based on stereotypes and accusing her of classism. Gorski also believes the educational field accepted her ideas too readily, without the proper critical analysis, as Payne's work is self-published and has not undergone the rigorous peer-review process usually required of professional academics.

An article by Gorski and one by University of Kansas education professors Jennifer C. Ng & John L. Rury (2006) in the Teachers College Record, entitled "Poverty and Education: A Critical Analysis of the Ruby Payne Phenomenon", began a heated debate between Payne and her supporters, and her critics in the mainstream academic community. Payne has threatened a copyright lawsuit against Gorski. A more extensive article critical of Payne's work was published by Randy Bomer, Joel E. Dworin, Laura May & Peggy Semingson of the University of Texas in 2008, also in Teachers College Record, with a response from Payne and a rejoinder from the authors. Ng and Rury also published a critical article in the online Journal of Educational Controversy in 2009.

Books
A Framework for Understanding Poverty. Baytown, TX: RFT, 1995
A Framework for Understanding Poverty Workbook. Baytown, TX: RFT, 1998
Learning Structures. Baytown, TX: RFT, 1998
Think Rather of Zebra: Dealing with Aspects of Poverty Through Story, with Jay Stailey. Baytown, TX: RFT, 1998
Bridges out of Poverty: Strategies for Professionals and Communities, with Philip DeVol and Terie Dreussi-Smith. Baytown, TX: RFT, 1999
Removing the Mask: Giftedness in Poverty, with Paul Slocumb. Baytown, TX: RFT, 1999
What Every Church Member Should Know About Poverty, with Bill Ehlig. Baytown, TX: RFT, 1999
Boys in Poverty: A Framework for Understanding Dropout, with Paul Slocumb. Bloomington, IN: Solution Tree, 2010
Achievement for All: Keys to Educating Middle Grades Students in Poverty. Westerville, OH: Association for Middle Level Educators (2013)

See also
Cycle of poverty

References

External links
 Official biography at aha! Process

American educators
American anti-poverty advocates
Living people
Year of birth missing (living people)
21st-century American women writers